Posyolok sanatoriya imeni Lenina is a rural locality (a settlement) in Penkinskoye Rural Settlement, Kameshkovsky District, Vladimir Oblast, Russia. The population was 23 as of 2010.

Geography 
The settlement is located on the Klyazma River, 33 km southwest of Kameshkovo (the district's administrative centre) by road. Trofimovka is the nearest rural locality.

References 

Rural localities in Kameshkovsky District